The men's 200 metres event at the 2008 African Championships in Athletics was held at the Addis Ababa Stadium on May 3–4.

Medalists

Results

Heats
Qualification: First 3 of each heat (Q) and the next 6 fastest (q) qualified for the semifinals.

Wind: Heat 1: -2.1 m/s, Heat 2: -1.8 m/s, Heat 3: -0.2 m/s, Heat 4: -1.0 m/s, Heat 5: -1.8 m/s, Heat 6: -0.7 m/s

Semifinals
Qualification: First 2 of each semifinal (Q) and the next 2 fastest (q) qualified for the final.

Wind: Heat 1: -5.5 m/s, Heat 2: +3.7 m/s, Heat 3: -3.6 m/s

Final
Wind: +0.3 m/s

References
Results (Archived)

2008 African Championships in Athletics
200 metres at the African Championships in Athletics